Romeo Montague is the male protagonist of William Shakespeare's tragedy Romeo and Juliet. The son of Lord Montague and his wife, Lady Montague, he secretly loves and marries Juliet, a member of the rival House of Capulet, through a priest named Friar Laurence. 

Forced into exile after slaying Juliet's cousin, Tybalt, in a duel, Romeo commits suicide upon hearing falsely of Juliet's death.

The character's origins can be traced as far back as Pyramus, who appears in Ovid's Metamorphoses, but the first modern incarnation of Romeo is Mariotto in the 33rd of Masuccio Salernitano's Il Novellino (1476). This story was reworked in 1524 by Luigi da Porto as Giulietta e Romeo (published posthumously in 1531). Da Porto named the character Romeo Montecchi and his storyline is near-identical to Shakespeare's adaptation. Since no 16th-century direct English translation of Giulietta e Romeo is known, Shakespeare's main source is thought to be Arthur Brooke's English verse translation of a French translation of a 1554 adaptation by Matteo Bandello. Although both Salernitano and da Porto claimed that their stories had historical basis, there is little evidence that this is the case.

Romeo, an only child like Juliet, is one of the most important characters of the play, and has a consistent presence throughout it. His role as an idealistic lover has led the word "Romeo" to become a synonym for a passionate male lover in various languages.  Although often treated as such, it is not clear that "Montague" is a surname in the modern sense.

Origins 
The earliest tale bearing a resemblance to Shakespeare's Romeo and Juliet is Xenophon of Ephesus'  Ephesiaca, whose heroic figure is a Habrocomes. The character of Romeo is also similar to that of Pyramus in Ovid's Metamorphoses, a youth who is unable to meet the object of his affection due to an ancient family quarrel, and later kills himself due to mistakenly believing her to have been dead. Although it is unlikely that Shakespeare directly borrowed from Ovid while writing Romeo and Juliet, the story was likely an influence on the Italian writers whom the playwright was greatly indebted to. The two sources which Shakespeare most likely consulted are Brooke's translation of da Porto and William Painter's The goodly historye of the true, and constant Love between Romeo and Juliet.

Film portrayals 
Romeo and Juliet has been adapted into film several times, and the part of Romeo has been played by several actors, including

 Leonard Whiting in Franco Zeffirelli's 1968 film, Romeo and Juliet, opposite Olivia Hussey as Juliet.
 Leslie Howard in George Cukor's 1936 film, Romeo and Juliet, opposite Norma Shearer as Juliet.
 Laurence Harvey
 Leonardo DiCaprio in Baz Luhrmann's modernized 1996 version, Romeo + Juliet, alongside Claire Danes as Juliet.
 Douglas Booth in Carlo Carlei's 2013 Romeo and Juliet film adaptation, opposite Hailee Steinfeld as Juliet.
 Orlando Bloom in a Broadway adaption in 2013.
 Jordan Luke Gage in the West End musical & Juliet.
 Kyle Allen plays the character in Rosaline (2022 Film).

Other portrayals
 Nice Peter in an episode of the Youtube comedy series Epic Rap Battles of History.

References

Bibliography

External links 

 Complete listing of all of Romeo's lines

Literary characters introduced in 1597
Fictional Italian people in literature
Fictional exiles
Fictional princes
Fictional murderers
Male Shakespearean characters
Male characters in literature
Male characters in film
Characters in Romeo and Juliet
Fictional suicides
Teenage characters in film